Libertarianism is variously defined by sources as there is no general consensus among scholars on the definition nor on how one should use the term as a historical category. Scholars generally agree that libertarianism refers to the group of political philosophies which emphasize freedom, individual liberty and voluntary association. Libertarians generally advocate a society with little or no government power.

The Stanford Encyclopedia of Philosophy defines libertarianism as the moral view that agents initially fully own themselves and have certain moral powers to acquire property rights in external things. Libertarian historian George Woodcock defines libertarianism as the philosophy that fundamentally doubts authority and advocates transforming society by reform or revolution. Libertarian philosopher Roderick T. Long defines libertarianism as "any political position that advocates a radical redistribution of power from the coercive state to voluntary associations of free individuals", whether "voluntary association" takes the form of the free market or of communal co-operatives. According to the American Libertarian Party, libertarianism is the advocacy of a government that is funded voluntarily and limited to protecting individuals from coercion and violence.

There are many philosophical disagreements among proponents of libertarianism concerning questions of ideology, values and strategy. For instance, left-libertarians were the ones to coin the term as a synonym for anarchism. Outside of the United States, libertarianism is still synonymous with anarchism and socialism (social anarchism and libertarian socialism). Right-libertarianism, known in the United States simply as libertarianism, was coined as a synonym for classical liberalism in May 1955 by writer Dean Russell due to American liberals embracing progressivism and economic interventionism in the early 20th century after the Great Depression and with the New Deal. As a result, the term was co-opted in the mid-20th century to instead advocate laissez-faire capitalism and strong private property rights such as in land, infrastructure and natural resources. The main debate between the two forms of libertarianism therefore concerns the legitimacy of private property and its meaning. Most other debates remains within right-libertarianism as abortion, capital punishment, foreign affairs, LGBT rights and immigration are non-issues for left-libertarians whereas within right-libertarianism they are debated due to their divide between cultural liberal and cultural conservative right-libertarians.

Philosophy 

Libertarian philosophies are generally divided on three principal questions, namely (1) by ethical theory, whether actions are determined to be moral consequentially or in terms of natural rights (or deontologically); (2) the legitimacy of private property; and (3) the legitimacy of the state. Libertarian philosophy can therefore be broadly divided into eight groups based on these distinctions.

Abortion 

An estimated 60–70% of American libertarians believe women are entitled to abortion rights, although many who identify as pro-choice do maintain that abortion becomes homicidal at some stage during pregnancy and therefore should not remain legal beyond that point.

To the contrary, the Libertarian Party states that government should have no role in restricting abortion, implying opposition to any and all proposed federal or state legislation which might prohibit any method of abortion at any given stage of gestation. Groups like the Association of Libertarian Feminists and Pro-Choice Libertarians support keeping government out of the issue entirely.

On the other hand, Libertarians for Life argues that human zygotes, embryos and fetuses possess the same natural human rights and deserve the same protections as neonates, calling for outlawing abortion as an aggressive act against a rights-bearing unborn child. Former Texas Congressman Ron Paul, a figurehead of American libertarianism, is an anti-abortion physician as is his son Kentucky Senator Rand Paul. Nonetheless, most American libertarians, whether pro-choice or pro-life, agree the federal government should play no role in prohibiting, protecting, or facilitating abortion and oppose the Supreme Court conclusion in Roe v. Wade that abortion is a fundamental right if performed during the first trimester of pregnancy by virtue of an implicit constitutional right to privacy.

In addition, there are the property rights perspectives evictionism and departurism which allow that the unwanted fetus is a trespasser on the mother's property (her womb), but hold that this designation does not mean that the child may therefore be directly killed. The former view maintains that the trespasser may only be killed indirectly as a result of eviction, while the latter view upholds only non-lethal eviction during normal pregnancies.

Capital punishment 

Right-libertarians are divided on capital punishment, also known as the death penalty. Those opposing it generally see it as an excessive abuse of state power which is by its very nature irreversible, with American libertarians possibly seeing it also in conflict with the Bill of Rights ban on "cruel and unusual punishment". Some libertarians who believe capital punishment can be just under certain circumstances may oppose execution based on practical considerations. Those who support the death penalty do so on self-defense or retributive justice grounds.

Ethics 

There are broadly two different types of libertarianism which are based on ethical doctrines, namely consequentialist libertarianism and natural-rights libertarianism, or deontological libertarianism. Deontological libertarians have the view that natural rights exist and from there argue that initiation of force and fraud should never take place. Natural-rights libertarianism may include both right-libertarianism and left-libertarianism. Consequentialist libertarians argue that a free market and strong private property rights bring about beneficial consequences, such as wealth creation or efficiency, rather than subscribing to a theory of rights or justice. There are hybrid forms of libertarianism that combine deontological and consequentialist reasoning.

Contractarian libertarianism holds that any legitimate authority of government derives not from the consent of the governed, but rather from contract or mutual agreement, although this can be seen as reducible to consequentialism or deontologism depending on what grounds contracts are justified. Some libertarian socialists reject deontological and consequential approaches and use historical materialism to justify their political beliefs.

Foreign affairs 

Libertarians are generally against any military intervention in other countries. Other libertarians are also opposed to strategic alliances with foreign countries. According to its 2016 platform, the American Libertarian Party is against any foreign aid to other countries and the only wars that they support are in situations of self-defense. Such libertarians generally try to explain that they are not isolationists, but non-interventionists.

Immigration 

Libertarians generally support freedom of movement and open borders. However, some right-libertarians, particularly Hoppean anarcho-capitalists who propose the full privatization of land and natural resources, contend that a policy of open borders amounts to legalized trespassing.

Inheritance 
Libertarians disagree over what to do in absence of a will or contract in the event of death and over posthumous property rights. In the event of a contract, the contract is enforced according to the property owner's wishes. Typically, right-libertarians believe that any intestate property should go to the living relatives of the deceased and that none of the property should go to the government. Others say that if no will has been made, the property immediately enters the state of nature from which anyone (save the state) may homestead it.

Intellectual property 

Libertarians hold a variety of views on intellectual property (IP) and patents. Some libertarian natural rights theorists justify property rights in ideas and other intangibles just as they do property rights in physical goods, saying whoever made it owns it. Other libertarian natural rights theorists such as Stephan Kinsella have held that only physical material can be owned and that ownership of IP amount to an illegitimate claim of ownership over that which enters another's mind that cannot be removed or controlled without violation of the non-aggression axiom. Pro-IP libertarians of the utilitarian tradition say that IP maximizes innovation while anti-IP libertarians of the selfsame persuasion say that it causes shortages of innovation. This latter view holds that IP is a euphemism for intellectual protectionism and should be abolished altogether.

Land ownership 

Following political economist and social reformer Henry George's philosophy of classical liberalism known as Georgism and the single-tax movement of activists who supported it (see also the single tax), some free-market centrists and non-socialist left-libertarians known as geolibertarians argue that because land is not the product of human labor and it is inelastic in supply and essential for life and wealth creation, the market rental value of land should properly be considered commons. They interpret the Lockean proviso and the law of equal liberty to mean that exclusive land ownership beyond one's equal share of aggregate land value necessarily restricts the freedom of others to access natural space and resources. In order to promote freedom and minimize waste, they argue that absent improvements individuals should surrender the rental value of the land to which they hold legal title to the community as a subscription fee for the privilege to exclude others from the site. Since geolibertarians wish to limit the influence of government, they would have this revenue fund a universal basic income or citizen's dividend which would also function as a social safety net to replace the existing welfare system. Based on David Ricardo's law of rent, they further argue that this tax shift would serve to boost wages.

LGBT rights 
In general, libertarians oppose laws that limit the sexual freedom of adults.

However, there are some more niche schools of libertarianism that oppose these things, for example Hans Herman Hoppe.

Limited government 

Libertarians differ on whether any government at all is desirable. Some favor the existence of governments and see them as civilly necessary while others favor stateless societies and view the state as being undesirable, unnecessary and harmful, if not intrinsically evil.

Supporters of limited libertarian government or a night watchman state argue that placing all defense and courts under private control, regulated only by market demand, is an inherent miscarriage of justice because justice would be bought and sold as a commodity, thereby conflating authentic impartial justice with economic power. Market anarchists counter that having defense and courts controlled by the state is both immoral and an inefficient means of achieving both justice and security. Libertarian socialists hold that liberty is incompatible with state action based on a class struggle analysis of the state.

Mandatory vaccination 
RIght-libertarians are divided over mandatory vaccination. Some oppose mandatory vaccination on the grounds of it violating a person's individual liberty and being skeptical of government authority. Others support mandatory vaccination, arguing that libertarian principles prohibit reckless behaviour that puts other people at risk. According to Voice of America, "opposition to vaccination is often couched in libertarian terms: It's my body, my choice."

Natural resources 
Right-libertarians such as free-market environmentalists and Objectivists believe that environmental damage is more often than not a result of state ownership and mismanagement of natural resources, for example by the military-industrial complex. Other right-libertarians such as anarcho-capitalists contend that private ownership of all natural resources will result in a better environment as a private owner of property will have more incentive to ensure the longer term value of the property. Other libertarians such as geolibertarians or left-libertarians believe the Earth cannot legitimately be held in allodium, that usufructuary title with periodic land value capture and redistribution avoids both the tragedy of the commons and the tragedy of the anticommons while respecting equal rights to natural resources.

Propertarianism 

Right-libertarian philosophies are usually strong propertarians that define liberty as non-aggression, or the state in which no person or group aggresses against any other person or group, where aggression is defined as the violation of private property. This philosophy implicitly recognizes private property as the sole source of legitimate authority. Propertarian libertarians hold that an order of private property is the only one that is both ethical and leads to the best possible outcomes. They generally support the free market and are not opposed to any concentration of power (monopolies), provided it is brought about through non-coercive means. However, there is also a minority of soft propertarian libertarian philosophies. According to this moderately left-libertarian perspective, a society based on individual liberty and equal access to natural opportunities can be achieved through proportionate compensation to others by those who claim private ownership over a greater-than-equal share of the aggregate value of natural resources, absent any improvements.

Non-propertarian libertarian philosophies hold that liberty is the absence of hierarchy and demands the leveling of systemically coercive and exploitative power structures. On this libertarian socialist view, a society based on freedom and equality can be achieved through abolishing authoritarian institutions that control certain means of production and subordinate the majority to an owning class or political and economic elite. Implicitly, it rejects any authority of private property and holds that it is not legitimate for someone to claim private ownership of any production resources to the detriment of others. Libertarian socialism is a group of political philosophies that promote a non-hierarchical, non-bureaucratic, stateless society without private property in the means of production. The term libertarian socialism is also used to differentiate this philosophy from state socialism. Libertarian socialists generally place their hopes in decentralized means of direct democracy such as libertarian municipalism, citizens' assemblies, trade unions and workers' councils.

Race and sex 
American libertarians, especially right-libertarians, are against laws that favor or harm any race or either sex. These include Jim Crow laws, state segregation, interracial marriage bans and laws that discriminate on the basis of sex. Likewise, they oppose state-enforced affirmative action, hate crime laws and anti-discrimination laws. They would not use the state to prevent voluntary affirmative action or voluntary discrimination. Most of these libertarians believe that the drive for profit in the marketplace will diminish or eliminate the effects of racism, which they tend to consider to be inherently collectivist. This causes a degree of dissonance among libertarians in federal systems such as in the United States, where there is debate among libertarians about whether the federal government has the right to coerce states to change their democratically created laws.

Taxation 
Some deontological libertarians believe that consistent adherence to libertarian doctrines such as the non-aggression principle demands unqualified moral opposition to any form of taxation, a sentiment encapsulated in the phrase "Taxation is theft!". They would fund all services through gratuitous contributions, private law and defense user fees as well as lotteries. Other libertarians support low taxes of various kinds, arguing that a society with no taxation would have difficulty providing public goods such as crime prevention and a consistent, unified legal system to punish rights violators. Commonly advocated reforms include a flat personal income tax, a consumption tax such as the FairTax, or a land value tax system. While the former proposals are normally considered necessary evils or strategic compromises, geolibertarians in particular argue that a single tax on the rental value of land, typically in conjunction with Pigovian pollution and severance fees to internalize negative externalities and curb natural resource depletion, is not only non-distortionary and politically sustainable but also more ethically attractive than zero taxation and even required for justice in property rights.

Voluntary slavery 
Libertarians generally believe that voluntary slavery is a contradiction in terms. However, certain right-libertarians dispute the Lockean claim that some rights are inalienable and maintain that even permanent voluntary slavery is possible and contractually binding. Famous libertarian Murray Rothbard argued that libertarians seeing children as property of the parents left the platform open to sales of children as slaves, when parents needed finances, and that people entering into voluntary slavery would most likely be when there was no alternative available to pay debts, but this was not coercive as under the libertarian platform only the government could engage in coercion. Detractors maintain that there is no such thing as a morally-binding "slavery contract".

Involuntary psychiatry 

Involuntary commitment, outpatient commitment, and involuntary treatment, although in opposition to self-ownership and in some countries the main way of confinement and social control are issues rarely discussed by libertarians.

Thomas Szasz argues that involuntary psychiatry is incompatible with libertarianism and that Bertrand Russell, Robert Nozick, John Stuart Mill, Ayn Rand, The American Civil Liberties Union, and Friedrich von Hayek among other "went wrong" by their omission, ambiguity or direct support.

Most criticism comes from fields such as sociology (such as Michel Foucault), psychiatry (such as Franco Basaglia), human rights NGOs or philosophy and public position by libertarians are often uncertain.

Strategy

Non-voting 

Some libertarians such as agorists employ non-voting as a political tactic and following 19th-century individualist anarchists like Lysander Spooner and Benjamin Tucker consider voting an immoral concession of state legitimacy. Others who champion the concept of rational ignorance view voting as an impractical and irrational behavior on a cost-benefit analysis. Other more moderate libertarians abstain from voting to voice their feeling that the current system is broken or out of touch.

Apart from principled and cynical non-voters, many libertarians interpret voting even for a suboptimal candidate or policy as an act of political self-defense aimed at minimizing rights violations.

Political alliances 

Until fairly recently, American libertarians have allied politically with modern conservatives over economic issues and gun laws while they are more prone to ally with liberals on other civil liberties issues and non-interventionism. As conservatives increasingly favor protectionism over free and open trade, and progressives increasingly favor restrictions on speech deemed offensive or disinformative, the popular characterization of libertarian policy as economically conservative and socially liberal has been rendered less meaningful. Libertarians may choose to vote for candidates of other parties depending on the individual and the issues they promote. Paleolibertarians have a long-standing affinity with paleoconservatives in opposing United States interventions and promoting decentralization and cultural conservatism.

Revolution 
Libertarians generally agree on the desirability of rapid and fundamental changes in power dynamics and institutional structures, but may disagree on the means by which such changes might be achieved. Orthodox right-libertarians strongly oppose violent revolution as unethical and counterproductive, however there is currently a growing amount of right-libertarians, inspired by the Founding Fathers of the United States, that believe in revolution as a justified means to counter what they see as a corrupt government. Left-libertarians, especially anarchists and socialists, regard the state to be at the definitional center of structural violence, directly or indirectly preventing people from meeting their basic needs, calling for violence as self-defense and seeing violent revolution as necessary in the abolition of capitalist society, mainly to counteract the violence inherent in both capitalism and government (some of them have also come to believe that violence, especially self-defense, is justified as a way to provoke social upheaval which could lead to a social revolution) while others argue in favor of a non-violent revolution through a process of dual power and pacifists see the concept of the general strike as the great revolutionary weapon. Market anarchists of a left-wing persuasion such as agorists also advocate various forms of nonviolent resistance, tax resistance or evasion, public acts of civic disloyalty and disobedience, counter-economics and subversive black markets.

See also 

 Anarcho-capitalism and minarchism
 Factions in the Libertarian Party (United States)
 Issues in anarchism
 Left-libertarianism
 Outline of libertarianism
 Philosophy of law
 Political ethics
 Political philosophy
 Right-libertarianism

References

Further reading